Francisco de Figueroa, O.S.A. (1634–1691) was a Roman Catholic prelate who served as Bishop of Tropea (1685–1691).

Biography
Francisco de Figueroa was born in Medinaceli, Spain on 16 January 1634 and ordained a priest in the Order of Saint Augustine.
On 24 January 1685, he was selected by the King of Spain and confirmed by Pope Innocent XI on 9 April 1685 as Bishop of Tropea.
He served as Bishop of Tropea until his death on 4 October 1691.

References

External links and additional sources
 (for Chronology of Bishops) 
 (for Chronology of Bishops) 

17th-century Italian Roman Catholic bishops
Bishops appointed by Pope Innocent XI
1634 births
1691 deaths
People from the Province of Soria
Augustinian bishops